Stefan Đurić (born 16 November 1989), better known as Rasta, is a Serbian rapper and singer from Priština. He gained mainstream recognition with his singles "Kavasaki" (2014) and "Cavali" (2015), and is additionally known for popularizing the Auto-Tune pitch correction effect in the western Balkans and for often promoting marijuana in his songs. 

Rasta founded a record label imprint, called Balkaton Gang.

Early life
Stefan Đurić was born on 16 November 1989 in Priština, SFR Yugoslavia. His parents, Slađana and Drago Đurić, worked as professors at the University of Belgrade. When the Kosovo War began, he relocated to Srebrenica where he lived with his grandmother. After several years, Đurić eventually settled in Belgrade, where he was reunited with his parents. Before he started creating music, Đurić had initially hosted a show about reggae on the Radio Belgrade as a teenager.

Career
Rasta began his career in the early two-thousands by organizing R&B and dancehall parties in Belgrade as well as by writing music for student films. Before pursuing a solo career, he had been involved in collectives Prva Postava and Show Program, where he served as a singjay. His debut mixtape, titled Sensemilia Mixtape, was released in 2009 featuring LMR. The following year, Rasta released his succeeding bodies of work, R&B-influenced One i lova in collaboration with Cvija and crunk-influenced Kaseta featuring hip hop collective Unija. Same year in April, he also served as the opening act for 50 Cent in Belgrade.

In December 2011, Rasta released his first album, titled Superstar, through Mascom Records. The album, produced by Coby, was also created in collaboration with Serbian hip hop label Bassivity Music, whom he continued working with afterwards. 

In July 2014, Rasta broke through mainstream with his viral hit "Kavasaki", collecting over 60 million views on YouTube. The success was followed with his next single "Kavali", released in June the following year, which surpassed "Kavasaki" in views. Also in 2015, he established a record label in partnership with Bassivity, called Balkaton. With singles "Euforija" and "Hotel", released during the summer of 2016, he solidified his position as one of the most popular regional artists, especially in Serbian diaspora. During these years, Rasta also started writing and producing songs for other popular Serbian performers, including Dara Bubamara, Ana Nikolić, Ana Stanić, Sandra Afrika and Elena Kitić.

In February 2017, he released his studio album Indigo, which was divided into two parts. Same year, Đurić, alongside his then-wife Ana Nikolić, served as the judge on the fifth season of the reality competition show Ja imam talenat!, which is the Serbian spin-off of Got Talent. By the end of 2017, his duet with Nikolić "Slučajnost" was declared by YouTube as the most viewed music video in Serbia by a local artist, second overall to "Despacito". His song "Indigo" also placed seventh on the list. In 2018, he released Don Reggaeton, which was followed by a concert in the Belgrade Arena on 4 September, making him the first Serbian solo rap act to achieve that.

In July 2020, Rasta and Relja Popović released a duet, titled "Genge". In July 2021, he collaborated with Nataša Bekvalac on their single "Iz daleka". In May the following year, Đurić released Geto Sport Mixtape, which he wrote while he was in house arrest. In September 2022, it was announced that Rasta would record a song, titled "Preko sveta", for the Serbian national football team for the 2022 FIFA World Cup.

Personal life
On 28 July 2016, Đurić married singer Ana Nikolić. They welcomed their daughter, named Tara, on 7 August 2017. The couple separated later that year and eventually filed for a divorce in November 2018.

In April 2017, Đurić was accused of assaulting the owner of the label Mascom, Slobodan Nešović, due to unpaid wages of his 2012 release. In May, Rasta denied the accusation at court and was eventually released of charge two years later in March.
 
On 2 October 2020, he was also arrested on a charge of possessing illegal substances. After spending close to four months in jail, he pleaded guilty and was sentenced to a year of house arrest.

Discography
Sensemilia Mixtape (2009)
One i lova (2010)
Kaseta (2010)
Superstar (2011)
Indigo (2017)
Don Reggaeton (2018)
Air Max Reggae (2019)
Geto Sport Mixtape (2022)

Awards and nominations

See also
Music of Serbia
Serbian hip-hop

References

External links

1989 births
Living people
Kosovo Serbs
Musicians from Pristina
Musicians from Belgrade
21st-century Serbian male singers
Serbian rappers
Serbian record producers